Hamad Naif Al Enezi (born 5 October 1986) is a Kuwaiti footballer who is a forward for the Kuwaiti Premier League club Al Qadsia.

International goals

References

1986 births
Living people
Kuwaiti footballers
Qadsia SC players
Al-Arabi SC (Kuwait) players
Association football forwards
Kuwait international footballers
2011 AFC Asian Cup players
Footballers at the 2006 Asian Games
Sportspeople from Kuwait City
Asian Games competitors for Kuwait
Al Salmiya SC players
Kuwait Premier League players